Mastrantonio is a surname concentrated mainly in Italy, which may be its originating country too. Notable people with the surname include:

Ella Mastrantonio (born 1992), Australian footballer
Mary Elizabeth Mastrantonio (born 1958), American actress and singer
Paolo Mastrantonio (born 1967), Italian footballer

Italian-language surnames
Patronymic surnames